JS Harima (AOS-5202) is a Hibiki-class ocean surveillance ship of Japan Maritime Self-Defense Force.

Development and design 
Each vessel has a crew of 40, including five American civilian technicians, and a flight deck for helicopters to operate off of. They are able to deploy on station for 90 days.

The vessels have an AN/UQQ-2 Surveillance Towed Array Sensor System (SURTASS), which is installed in the United States. Data from the sensors is relayed through the Defense Satellite Communications System, and processed and shared with the United States. The data is fed into the Integrated Undersea Surveillance System.

Propulsion is provided by four Mitsubishi S6U-MPTK diesel electric engines.

Construction and career
Harima was laid down on 26 December 1990 at Mitsui Engineering & Shipbuilding, Tamano and launched on 11 September 1991. She's commissioned on 10 March 1992. Currently, her homeport is in Kure.

On 4 February 2001, 4:11 am, about 110 km south of the main island of Okinawa, 25 degrees 08.4 minutes north latitude, 127 degrees 32.0 minutes east longitude, tuna longline fishing boat belonging to the Naha district fishing port in Okinawa Prefecture 11th Hikei Maru (9.1 tons) The longline was scratched by the outer panel of the center of the starboard side, and a hole with a diameter of 50 cm occurred in the bow of the Hikei Maru, causing a wreck. On October 25, the same year, at the Naha Branch of the Japan Marine Accident Inquiry Agency, the Hikei Maru crew members took measures to prevent operations due to the lack of movement monitoring on the Harima side and non-compliance with navigation between various vessels. The ruling was made with the Hikei Maru crew as a warning, mainly due to insufficient navigation and non-compliance with navigation between various vessels. 

On 1 December 2015, the Oceanographic Command Group was reorganized into the Oceanographic Command and Anti-submarine Support Group, and was incorporated into the 1st Acoustic Measurement Corps, which was newly formed under the same group.

On 1 November 2017, the crew system was introduced to the 1st Acoustic Measurement Corps for the first time as a JMSDF ship, and from now on, the crew will not be fixed, and 3 crews will operate two ships alternately.

References

1991 ships
Ships built by Mitsui Engineering and Shipbuilding
Hibiki-class ocean surveillance ships